An architect is a professional trained in the planning, design, and supervision of the construction of buildings.

Architect may also refer to:

Arts, entertainment, and media

Films
 Die Architekten (The Architects), a 1990 East German film about the building of a satellite town
 The Architect (film), a 2006 drama film about an architect who is confronted by angry residents of a housing complex he designed.
 The Architect (2016 film), a comedy-drama film starring Parker Posey

Literature
 The Architect (novel), a novel by Australian author John Scott
The Architect, 1974 novel by Uzbek writer Mirmukhsin
The Architects, novel by Stefan Heym 1965

Music

Groups and labels
 Architect (band), an American hardcore band
 Architect, an alias for Daniel Meyer, electronic musician in the Haujobb project
 Architects (American band), a rock band from Kansas City, Missouri
 Architects (British band), a metalcore band from Brighton, England
 Architechs, a British music group
 Arkitekt, a British music group

Albums
 Architect (album), an album by Irish singer-songwriter Wallis Bird
 Architect, a musical side project by Daniel Myer of Haujobb
 The Architect (album), a 2017 album by British singer-songwriter Paloma Faith
 The Architect, album by Kerry Muzzey 2014
 The Architect, EP by Nyam Nyam 1985

Songs
 Architects (song), a song by Rise Against from the album Endgame
 "The Architects", a song by At the Gates from With Fear I Kiss the Burning Darkness 1993
 "The Architect", a song by The Charlatans from Simpatico 2006
 "The Architect", a song by The Crimson Armada from Guardians 2009
 "The Architect", a song from Doctor Who: Series 8 2015
 "The Architect", a song by Deus from Vantage Point, 2009
 "The Architect", a song by Erra from Impulse, 2011
 "The Architect", a song by Paloma Faith from The Architect, 2017
 "The Architect", a song by Haken from Affinity, 2016
 "The Architect", a song by Red Light Company from Fine Fascination, 2009
 "The Architect", a song by Shrinebuilder from Shrinebuilder, 2009

Other arts, entertainment, and media
 Architect (The Matrix), a character in the latter two Matrix films
 Architect (magazine), an American magazine

Other uses
 Architect (role variant), a personality type in the Keirsey Temperament Sorter
 Architect (software), an open source integrated development environment
 Systems architect, a profession in information and communications technology

See also
 Architecture (disambiguation)